Sergei Pavlovich Kryuchikhin (born 15 January 1984) is a Russian former professional footballer.

External links
 

1984 births
Sportspeople from Krasnodar
Living people
Russian footballers
Russian expatriate footballers
Association football defenders
FC Arsenal Kyiv players
FC Zimbru Chișinău players
FC Gornyak Uchaly players
FC Armavir players
Ukrainian Premier League players
Moldovan Super Liga players
Expatriate footballers in Ukraine
Expatriate footballers in Moldova